Funk or Walk is the debut album by the Brides of Funkenstein, released on Atlantic Records in September 1978. The album was produced by George Clinton with the exception of the album's first single "Disco To Go" which was written and produced by Clinton and Bootsy Collins. The Brides of Funkenstein consisted of Lynn Mabry and Dawn Silva, who were members of Sly and the Family Stone prior to joining P-Funk. Funk Or Walk earned Mabry and Silva a Record World Award for Best New Female Artists and Best New R&B Group in 1979.  The song was originally performed live by Bootsy's Rubber Band. To this day, the P-Funk All Stars continue to play "Disco To Go" in their live concerts. The Brides of Funkenstein also toured and recorded with Parliament/Funkadelic around this same time.

Funk Or Walk was licensed through Warner Music-Japan and released through the Vivid Sound label (VSCD-276) in 2006. The album was later reissued in the U.S. by the Wounded Bird label on October 18, 2011.

Track listing
"Disco to Go" (George Clinton, William Collins) (released as 7" single Atlantic 3498 and 12" single Atlantic DSKO-129) 5:03
"War Ship Touchante" (George Clinton, Bernie Worrell, Archie Ivy) (released as single Atlantic 3556) 5:27
"Nappy" (George Clinton, Bernie Worrell, Jim Vitti, Garry Shider) 4:29
"Birdie" (George Clinton, Rodney Curtis) 5:39
"Just Like You" (George Clinton, Lynn Mabry, Garry Shider) 9:11
"When You're Gone" (Gary Cooper, Ron Dunbar) (released as b-side to "Disco To Go") 5:19
"Amorous" (Garry Shider, Ron Dunbar, Rodney Curtis) (released as the b-side of "War Ship Touchante") 4:54

Personnel
Vocals Dawn Silva, Lynn Mabry
Bass: Bootsy Collins, Rodney Curtis
Guitars: Phelps Collins, Michael Hampton, Garry Shider
Drums: Frank Waddy, Bootsy Collins, Gary Cooper, Tyrone Lampkin, Jerome Brailey
Horns: Wayman Reed, George Minger, Danny Turner
Strings: Detroit Symphony
Percussion: Larry Fratangelo
Keyboards: Bernie Worrell, Joel Johnson
Background vocals: Gary Mudbone Cooper, Jeanette Washington, Ron Banks, Larry Demps

References 

The Brides of Funkenstein albums
1978 debut albums
Atlantic Records albums